A hi-hat (hihat, high-hat, etc.) is a combination of two cymbals and a pedal, all mounted on a metal stand. It is a part of the standard drum kit used by drummers in many styles of music including rock, pop, jazz, and blues. Hi-hats consist of a matching pair of small to medium-sized cymbals mounted on a stand, with the two cymbals facing each other. The bottom cymbal is fixed and the top is mounted on a rod which moves the top cymbal toward the bottom one when the pedal is depressed (a hi-hat that is in this position is said to be "closed" or "closed hi-hats").

The hi-hat evolved from a "sock cymbal", a pair of similar cymbals mounted at ground level on a hinged, spring-loaded foot apparatus. Drummers invented the first sock cymbals to enable one drummer to play multiple percussion instruments at the same time. Over time these became mounted on short stands—also known as "low-boys"—and activated by pedals similar to those used in modern hi-hats.  When extended upward roughly 3' (76 cm) they were originally known as "high sock" cymbals, which evolved over time to the familiar "high-hat" term.

The cymbals may be played by closing them together with the pedal, which creates a "chck" sound or striking them with a stick, which may be done with them open, closed, open and then closed after striking to dampen the ring, or closed and then opened to create a shimmering effect at the end of the note. Depending on how hard a hi-hat is struck and whether it is "open" (i.e., pedal not pressed, so the two cymbals are not closed together), a hi-hat can produce a range of dynamics, from very quiet "chck" (or "chick") sounds, done with merely gently pressing the pedal—this is suitable for soft accompaniment during a ballad or the start of a guitar solo—to very loud (e.g. striking fully open hats hard with sticks, a technique used in loud heavy metal music songs).

While the term hi-hat normally refers to the entire setup (two cymbals, stand, pedal, rod mechanism), in some cases, drummers use it to refer exclusively to the two cymbals themselves.

History

Initial versions of the hi-hat were called clangers, which were small cymbals mounted onto a bass drum rim and struck with an arm on the bass drum pedal. Then came shoes, which were two hinged boards with cymbals on the ends that were clashed together. Next was the low-sock, low-boy or low-hat, pedal-activated cymbals employing an ankle-high apparatus similar to a modern hi-hat stand.

Hi-hats that were raised and could be played by hand as well as foot may have been developed around 1926 by Barney Walberg of the drum accessory company Walberg and Auge. The first recognized master of the new instrument was "Papa" Jo Jones, whose playing of timekeeping "ride" rhythms while striking the hi-hat as it opened and closed inspired the innovation of the ride cymbal. Another claim, published in Jazz Profiles Blogspot on 8 August 2008, to the invention of the hi-hat is attributed to drummer William "O'Neil" Spencer (b.1909-d.1944). Legendary Jazz drummer, "Philly Joe Jones" (born as Joseph Rudolph Jones, b.1923-d.1985), was quoted describing his understanding about the hi-hat history. Jones said, "I really dug O'Neil. He came to club in Philadelphia where I was working in 1943, I think it was, and talked to me about the hi-hat. I was using a foot cymbal, the low-hat. O'Neil was the one who invented the hi-hat. I believe that, man. He suggested I close the hat on '2' and '4' when playing 4/4 time. The idea seemed so right hadn't heard anyone do that before." The editor of the 2008 Jazz Profiles article made specific mention to others who are thought to invent the hi-hat, including Jo Jones, but also Kaiser Marshall. Not to take away from Papa Jones accomplishments in drumming style and technique, a 2013 Modern Drummer article credits Papa Jones with being the first to use brushes on drums and shifting time keeping from the bass drum to the hi-hat (providing a "swing-pulse focus").

In the early 1970s, hard rock drummers (including Led Zeppelin's John Bonham) began to use  hi-hats, such as the Paiste Giant Beat. In the late 1980s, Zildjian released its revolutionary  Special Recording hats, which were small, heavy hi-hat cymbals intended for close miking either live or recording, and other manufacturers quickly followed suit, Sabian for example with their  mini hats. In the early to mid-1990s, Paiste offered  mini hi-hats as part of its Visions series, which were among the world's smallest hi-hats. Starting in the 1980s, a number of manufacturers also experimented with rivets in the lower cymbal. But by the end of the 1990s, the standard size was again , with  a less-common alternative, and smaller hats mainly used for special sounds. Rivets in hi-hats failed to catch on.

Modern hi-hat cymbals are much heavier than modern crash cymbals, reflecting the trend to lighter and thinner crash cymbals as well as to heavier hi-hats. Another evolution is that a pair of hi-hat cymbals may not be identical, with the bottom often heavier than the top, and possibly vented. Some examples are Sabian's Fusion Hats with holes in the bottom cymbal, and the Sabian X-cellerator, Zildjian Master Sound and Zildjian Quick Beats, Paiste Sound Edge, and Meinl Soundwave. Some drummers even use completely mismatched hi-hats from different cymbal ranges (Zildjian's K/Z hats), of different manufacturers, and even of different sizes (similar to the K Custom Session Hats where the top hat is a  smaller than the bottom). Max Roach was particularly known for using a  top with a  bottom.

Other recent developments include the X-hat (fixed, closed, or half-open hi-hats) and cable-controlled or remote hi-hats. Sabian introduced the Triple Hi-Hat, designed by Peter Kuppers. In this variation of the hi-hat, the top cymbal moves down and the bottom cymbal moves up simultaneously while the middle cymbal remains stationary.

Drop-clutches are also used to lock and release hi-hats while both feet are in use playing double bass drums.

Modern stands

The standard hi-hat features two cymbals mounted on a stand consisting of a mating metal tube and rod supported by a tripod and linked to a pedal.  The stationary bottom cymbal sits atop the tube, typically parallel to the ground, but is often fitted with an adjustment screw allowing it to be set slightly tilted.  The top cymbal is mounted bell up on the rod and closed against the bottom by foot pressure on the pedal.

An integrated clutch assembly includes a spring which may be adjusted to set resistance, which also varies rate and tension of return, as well as an adjustment for the gap between cymbals when open.

Standard terminology has evolved. Open and closed hi-hat refer to notes struck while the two cymbals are apart or together (open or closed), while pedal hi-hat refers to parts or notes played solely with the pedal used to strike the two cymbals. Most cymbal patterns consist of both open and closed notes.

Some hi-hats allow the tripod to be tilted or rotated.  Another configuration omits the tripod and attaches the stand to the side of the bass drum, particular suitable for kits with very large or double bass drums.

Clutch
The standard clutch uses a knurled collar partially threaded below the cymbal and a pair of knurled rings above it. The collar is tightened against the end of the thread, while the rings are tightened against each other.

Drop clutch
A drop clutch allows a pair of hats mounted on a conventional hi-hat stand to be closed without use of the pedal.

The drop clutch is provided with a lever that can be operated by hand or struck with a drumstick. This action releases the upper hi-hat cymbal, which falls onto the bottom cymbal and remains there, with gravity then holding the hats loosely closed, and allowing them to be played by the sticks in this position. Operation of the pedal re-engages the clutch and allows the player to resume normal playing.

Drop clutches were developed to allow players using double bass drum pedals to play closed hi-hats without needing to operate the hi-hat pedal, and this remains their primary application.

As it relies on gravity to close the cymbals, the drop clutch gives the player no control over the tension holding them together, and supplies only minimal tension. On the other hand, if the player manually lowers the top cymbal of a standard hi-hat stand before playing, this allows any desired tension to be set, and the pedal can still be used to increase the tension while playing, but not to open the hats or to reduce the tension. Some drummers prefer this technique and reject the drop clutch as too limiting to the sounds available.

In 2020, Tama introduced the Sizzle Touch Drop Clutch. This clutch when dropped, allows the distance between the top and bottom cymbals to be adjusted via an adjustment bolt on top of the clutch. To return the clutch to functioning as a standard one, the drummer depresses the hi-hat stand's pedal.

A less common alternative is the locking hi-hat pedal, such as the Tama "Cobra Clutch". This and similar high-end locking pedals do allow for control over the tension. It is engaged by pressing a lock pedal separate from the main pedal.

Cable hats
A cable hat or remote hat uses a cable to allow hi-hat cymbals to be positioned independently of the pedal. Operation is otherwise normal.

X-hats
An X-hat is an adapter to allow a pair of hi-hat cymbals to be mounted in a closed position on a cymbal stand. There is no pedal, the hats are simply kept closed at a constant tension, similar to a cymbal stack. They are associated with heavy metal music, particularly styles that use double bass drumming, a two-foot technique. By using an X-hat, a drummer who is already using both feet on the bass drum
pedals can still play hi-hat.

Different cymbal hi-hats
Besides traditional hi-hat cymbals (normally 14" but also commonly 13" or 15") the enormous variety of cymbals available means many of them are used as hi-hats. Drummer Thomas Lang uses a hi-hat made out of Bell cymbals as his secondary hi-hat. Terry Bozzio uses two China cymbals in the form of a hi-hat as a kind of distortion hi-hat. Following this principle, Sabian alongside drummer Tony Verderosa, has developed the 12" VFX distortion hi-hats, mixing a Crash cymbal on the bottom with a China on the top.

Non-cymbal hi-hats
In addition to the many types of hi-hat cymbals on the market, there are also non-cymbal hi-hat pedals like the Latin Percussion Shekere hi-hat, the Remo Spoxe hi-hats created by Terry Bozzio in the late 80's, the Factory Metal Hat Crasherz or the Baldman Percussion Junk Hats. These kinds of percussion offer different textures in addition to the main hi-hat pedal on the drum kit and also options to expand the kit's pedal row.

Use

When struck closed or played with the pedal, the hi-hat gives a short, crisp, muted percussive sound, referred to as a "chick". Adjusting the gap between the cymbals can alter the sound of the open hi-hat from a shimmering, sustained tone to something similar to a ride cymbal. When struck with a drumstick, the cymbals make either a short, snappy sound or a longer sustaining sandy sound depending on the position of the pedal.

It can also be played just by lifting and lowering the foot to clash the cymbals together, a style commonly used to accent beats 2 and 4 in jazz music. In rock music, the hi-hats are commonly struck every beat, or on beats 1 and 3, while the cymbals are held together. The drummer can control the sound by foot pressure. Less pressure allows the cymbals to rub together more freely, giving both greater sustain and greater volume for accent or crescendo. In shuffle time, a rhythm known as "cooking" is often employed. To produce this the cymbals are struck twice in rapid succession, being held closed on the first stroke and allowed to open just before the second, then allowed to ring before being closed with a chick to complete the pattern (the cymbals may or may not be struck on the chick).

A right-handed drummer will normally play the hi-hat pedal with his left foot, and may use one or both drumsticks. The traditional hi-hat rhythms of rock and jazz were produced by crossing the hands over, so the right stick would play the hi-hat while the left played the snare drum below it, but this is not universal. Some top modern drummers like Billy Cobham, Carter Beauford, Shawn Drover and Simon Phillips, play open handed, striking with their left. Some, such as Kenny Aronoff, and Jason Finn of The Presidents of the United States of America, use both techniques. Some drum kits may also include an extra hi-hat on the right for right-handed players. This is shown when drums or cymbals in the middle of the set are played with the hi-hat rhythm. The technique is common with metal genres, such as Lars Ulrich of Metallica and Mike Portnoy formerly of Dream Theater. In both rock and jazz, the drummer will often move the same stick pattern between the hi-hat cymbal and the ride cymbal, for example using the hi-hat in the verses and the ride in the chorus of a song, or using the ride to accompany a lead break or other instrumental solo.

Roger Taylor, drummer for the band Queen, plays with many unique hi-hat techniques, including opening of the hi-hat on every backbeat for a rhythm emphasis and leaving the hi-hat slightly open when hitting the snare. His trademark hi-hat beat is opening the hi-hat on first and third before hitting the snare.

Phil Rudd of AC/DC also uses distinct hi-hat techniques, which include very heavily accentuating the hi-hat hit on each beat and softer in between.

Charlie Watts of The Rolling Stones used a technique in which he does not play the hi-hat in unison with the snare drum at all.  If playing a standard 8th note pattern, he will play the hi-hat on 1 and 3 and not playing it on 2 and 4 where the snare drum is played.

In much hip-hop, the hi-hat is hit with drumsticks in a simple eighth-note pattern, although this playing is usually done by a drum machine or from an old recording from which the sound of a hi-hat is recorded and loaded into a sampler or similar recording-enabled equipment from which it is triggered.

References

Cymbals
Drum kit components
20th-century percussion instruments
North American percussion instruments
Foot percussion